Nowy Klępsk  is a village in the administrative district of Gmina Sulechów, within Zielona Góra County, Lubusz Voivodeship, in western Poland.

The village has a population of 30.

References

Villages in Zielona Góra County